Fourth Lake may refer to:
Fourth Lake (New York)
Fourth Lake (Bisby Lakes, New York)
Fourth Lake (Warren County, New York)
Fourth Lake (Vancouver Island)
Fourth Lake (Nova Scotia)